Sophie de Boer (born 12 December 1990) is a Dutch professional racing cyclist, who most recently rode for UCI Women's Continental Team .

Major results

Cyclo-cross

2009–2010
 Gazet van Antwerpen
3rd Koppenberg
2010–2011
 Superprestige
3rd Gavere
 Fidea Classics
3rd Niel
2011–2012
 Superprestige
2nd Gavere
 Gazet van Antwerpen
2nd Essen
 3rd National Championships
 Fidea Classics
3rd Leuven
3rd Antwerpen
2012–2013
 Superprestige
2nd Ruddervoorde
2013–2014
 2nd National Championships
 2nd Baden
 Soudal Classics
2nd Neerpelt
 Superprestige
3rd Hamme
 3rd Otegem
2014–2015
 3rd Overall Bpost Bank Trophy
1st Ronse
1st Koppenberg
1st Essen
 2nd National Championships
 2nd Brabant
 2nd Sint-Niklaas
2015–2016
 UCI World Cup
1st Hoogerheide
 Soudal Classics
1st Leuven
 Superprestige
2nd Hoogstraten
2nd Middelkerke
 2nd Maldegem
 Bpost Bank Trophy
3rd Antwerpen
2016–2017
 1st  Overall UCI World Cup
1st Las Vegas
2nd Cauberg
3rd Namur
3rd Rome
 Soudal Classics
1st Neerpelt
2nd Leuven
 1st Overijse
 1st Brabant
 2nd Overall Superprestige
1st Ruddervoorde
1st Hoogstraten
2nd Middelkerke
3rd Gieten
 3rd National Championships
 DVV Trophy
2nd Essen
2nd Antwerpen
3rd Ronse
3rd Koppenberg
 2nd Otegem
 Brico Cross
 3rd Maldegem
2017–2018
 UCI World Cup
2nd Koksijde
 Superprestige
3rd Gieten
 3rd Sint-Niklaas

See also
 2014 Parkhotel Valkenburg Continental Team season

References

External links

1990 births
Living people
Dutch female cyclists
Cyclists from Friesland
People from Drachten
Cyclo-cross cyclists
21st-century Dutch women